The 1951 Boston Red Sox season was the 51st season in the franchise's Major League Baseball history. The Red Sox finished third in the American League (AL) with a record of 87 wins and 67 losses, 11 games behind the New York Yankees, who went on to win the 1951 World Series.

Offseason 
 November 16, 1950: Joe DeMaestri was drafted from the Red Sox by the Chicago White Sox in the 1950 rule 5 draft.
 Prior to 1951 season: Bob Smith was signed as an amateur free agent by the Red Sox.

Regular season

Season standings

Record vs. opponents

Opening Day lineup

Roster

Player stats

Batting

Starters by position 
Note: Pos = Position; G = Games played; AB = At bats; H = Hits; Avg. = Batting average; HR = Home runs; RBI = Runs batted in

Other batters 
Note: G = Games played; AB = At bats; H = Hits; Avg. = Batting average; HR = Home runs; RBI = Runs batted in

Pitching

Starting pitchers 
Note: G = Games pitched; IP = Innings pitched; W = Wins; L = Losses; ERA = Earned run average; SO = Strikeouts

Other pitchers 
Note: G = Games pitched; IP = Innings pitched; W = Wins; L = Losses; ERA = Earned run average; SO = Strikeouts

Relief pitchers 
Note: G = Games pitched; W = Wins; L = Losses; SV = Saves; ERA = Earned run average; SO = Strikeouts

Farm system 

LEAGUE CHAMPIONS: Birmingham, Oneonta, High Point-Thomasville, Marion

References

External links
1951 Boston Red Sox team page at Baseball Reference
1951 Boston Red Sox season at baseball-almanac.com

Boston Red Sox seasons
Boston Red Sox
Boston Red Sox
1950s in Boston